The People's Liberation Army of Manipur, often shortened to just People's Liberation Army (PLA-MP or PLAM), founded by N. Bisheshwar Singh on 25 September 1978, is a separatist armed terrorist group fighting for a separate independent socialist state of Manipur, a state in northeastern India. 

Since its founding, it has been waging guerrilla warfare as part of the Insurgency in Manipur against the Indian Armed Forces, and has targeted the Indian Army, Indian Paramilitary Forces and the State Police Force. However, during the late nineties, it declared a unilateral decision not to target the Manipur Police.

The death of some top leaders in combat (like President Thoudam Kunjabehari in 1982), and the arrest of others (like N. Bisheshwar, arrested in 1981) decreased its military activity in the eighties. In 1989, a political wing called the Revolutionary People's Front (RPF) was formed. The RPF formed a government in exile in Bangladesh, led by Irengbam Chaoren, and began a restructuring of the organisation. The Organisation become very active. Its operation was divided into four sections: Sadar Valley West Hill areas of Manipur, Sadar Hill areas in the east Valley, Hill areas of Manipur and Imphal valley, each with a commander, and other ranks.

The organisation has an estimated strength of some 3 800 as of 2008.

PLA-MP is also a member of the Manipur Peoples Liberation Front, an umbrella organization of several Manipur separatist groups; namely, the UNLF and PREPAK.
On 29 July 2020, three jawans in the Assam Rifles were killed and six injured in an ambush in Manipur's Chandel district near the Indo-Myanmar border.

Flag 
Their flag is red with the emblem on the centre.

See also 

 Communist Party of India (Maoist)
 Maoist Communist Party of Manipur
 National Democratic Front of Bodoland
 People's Liberation Guerrilla Army (India)

References

External links 
 Description of the Organisation at Start Center: National Consortium for the Study of Terrorism and Responses to Terrorism 
 History and Organisation details at Global Security.org 

1978 establishments in Manipur
National liberation movements
Political parties in Manipur
Political parties established in 1978
Organizations based in Asia designated as terrorist
Separatism in India
Guerrilla organizations
Secessionist organizations in Asia
Insurgency in Northeast India
Military units and formations established in 1978
Far-left politics in India
Organisations based in Manipur
Maoist organisations in India
Organisations designated as terrorist by India
Left-wing militant groups in India
Communist militant groups